Rudolph Dittrich (23 December 1850 in Breslau – 19 December 1922 in Breslau ) was a German entomologist specialising in Coleoptera
and Hymenoptera. 
His Hymenoptera collection is in the Museum of Natural History Wroclaw University.

Works
Partial List
 Verzeichnis der bisher in Schlesien aufgefunden Hymenopteren. I. Apidae. Zeitschr. Entom. N.F (Breslau) 28: 19-54 (1903)
Hymenopterologische Bemerkungen. III. Ein Beitrag zum Wirtzeichnis derIchneumoniden. Jahresh. Schles. Insektenkunde.2,38-46 (1909)
Verzeichnis der bisher in Schlesien aufgefunden Hymenopteren. III. Rapacia. Jahr. Ver. Schles. Ins. Breslau, 4: 15-34
 Verzeichnis der bisher in Schlesien aufgefunden Hymenopteren. I. Apidae. Zeitschr. Entom. N.F (Breslau) 28: 19-54 (1911)
Chalicodoma muraria F. in einem Steinbuch der Umgegend von Frankenstein. Jahr. Ver. Schles. Ins. Breslau, 14: 6 
 Verzeichnis der bisher in Schlesien aufgefunden Hymenopteren. I. Apidae. Zeitschr. Entom. N.F (Breslau) 28: 19-54 (1924)

References 

German entomologists
Hymenopterists
1850 births
1922 deaths